Viverito is a surname. Notable people with the surname include:

Louis Viverito, American politician
Melissa Mark-Viverito (born 1969), American politician